A browser extension is a small software module for customizing a web browser. Browsers typically allow a variety of extensions, including user interface modifications, cookie management, ad blocking, and the custom scripting and styling of web pages.

Plug-ins
Browser plug-ins are a separate type of module. The main difference is that extensions are distributed as source code, while plug-ins are distributed as executables (i.e. object code). Plug-ins are no longer supported by the major browsers, but extensions are widely used. The most popular browser, Google Chrome, has over 100,000 extensions available but stopped supporting plug-ins in 2020.

History
Internet Explorer was the first major browser to support extensions, with the release of version 4 in 1999. Firefox has supported extensions since its launch in 2004. Opera began supporting extensions in 2009, and both Google Chrome and Safari did so the following year. Microsoft Edge added extension support in 2016.

API conformity
In 2015, a community working group formed under the W3C to create a single standard application programming interface (API) for browser extensions. While that goal is unlikely to be achieved, the majority of browsers already use the same or very similar APIs due to the popularity of Google Chrome.

Chrome was the first browser with an extension API based solely on HTML, CSS, and JavaScript. Beta testing for this capability began in 2009, and the following year Google opened the Chrome Web Store. As of June 2012, there were 750 million total installations of extensions and other content hosted on the store. In the same year, Chrome overtook Internet Explorer as the world's most popular browser, and its market share continued to grow, reaching 60% in 2018.

Because of Chrome's success, Microsoft created a very similar extension API for its Edge browser, with the goal of making it easy for Chrome extension developers to port their work to Edge. But after three years Edge still had a disappointingly small market share, so Microsoft rebuilt it as a Chromium-based browser. (Chromium is Google's open-source project that serves as the functional core of Chrome and many other browsers.) Now that Edge has the same API as Chrome, extensions can be installed directly from the Chrome Web Store.

With its own market share in decline, Mozilla also decided to conform. In 2015, the organization announced that the long-standing XUL and XPCOM extension capabilities of Firefox would be replaced with a less-permissive API very similar to Chrome's. This change was enacted in 2017. Firefox extensions are now largely compatible with their Chrome counterparts.

Until 2020, Apple was the lone major exception to this trend, but with the release of Safari 14 for macOS, the browser added support for extensions conforming to the Chrome API. The following year, extensions were enabled in the iOS version for the first time.

Unwanted behavior
Browser extensions typically have access to sensitive data, such as browsing history, and they have the ability to alter some browser settings, add user interface items, or replace website content. As a result, there have been instances of malware, so users need to be cautious about what extensions they install.

There have also been cases of applications installing browser extensions without the user's knowledge, making it hard for the user to uninstall the unwanted extension.

Some Google Chrome extension developers have sold their extensions to third-parties who then incorporated adware. In 2014, Google removed two such extensions from the Chrome Web Store after many users complained about unwanted pop-up ads. The following year, Google acknowledged that about five percent of visits to its own websites had been altered by extensions with adware.

References

External links
Extension API documentation from Google, Apple, Mozilla, Microsoft, Opera
Official extension stores for Chrome, Firefox, Edge, Opera

Software add-ons
Web browsers